A Reason to Believe is a 1995 American  drama independent film directed by Douglas Tirola. The film is set in Oxford, Ohio, and Cincinnati, Ohio, and was released on September 22, 1995.

Plot
Charlotte, a popular girl on campus, goes to a wild party while her boyfriend Wesley is not in town. When she realizes she's become too drunk, she tries to leave the party. But Jim, whom she danced with at the party, soon joins her and forces Charlotte into a sexual encounter. Feeling shame and self-blame, she grapples to find the courage to speak her mind. When she does, many of her friends don't believe her. In the meantime, Jim honestly doesn't think what happened that night was rape. But as members of his own fraternity and campus feminist groups begin to unpiece the puzzle, the ensuing experience challenges the trust and friendship of college students who thought they would be friends forever.

Cast
 Jay Underwood -  Jim Curran
 Allison Smith - Charlotte Byrne
 Danny Quinn - Wesley
 Georgia Emelin - Linda Perryman
 Kim Walker - Judith
 Keith Coogan - Potto
 Christopher Birt - Gary
 Lisa Lawrence - Alison
 Holly Marie Combs - Sharon
 Obba Babatundé - Prof. Thurman
 Mark Metcalf - Dean Kirby
 Robin Riker - Constance
 Afton Smith - Becky
 Joe Flanigan - Eric Sayles
 David Overlund - Freddy
 Jimmy Kieffer - Dave Brown (as Jim Kieffer)
 Mary Thomas - Tracy
 Michelle Stratton - Amy
 Rachel Parker - Donna
 Sally Kenyon - Daisy
 Andy Holcomb - Harvey
 Cary Spadafora - Nancy
 Terek Puckett - Lazy student
 Matt Johnston - Hippie student
 Tracy Keegan - ...
 Steve Carruthers - ...
 Christopher Trela - Kinko's brother
 Don Handfield - Nuj
 Jon Hoffman - Dean
 Claire Cundiff - Capt. Pepper
 Christian Meinhardt - Editor
 Tulane Chartock - Dean's secretary
 Carol O'Neil - Feminist hanging flyers
 Alex Wolfe - Asshole in quad
 Amy Smith - Bartender at Hole in the Wall
 Frank Martorana - Scared brother (as Frank Martina)
 Catherine Pinckert - Girl never studying
 Jeff Niles - ...
 Doye Trachtenberg - Biggest brother
 Doug Devine - Party brother
 Brett Kreutzmann - Shot-race brother

External links
 

1995 films
Films set in Cincinnati
American drama films
1995 drama films
American independent films
Films about fraternities and sororities
1990s English-language films
1990s American films